"Broken Mirror" (stylized as "BROKEN MIRROR") is a song by Japanese electronica/rock duo Boom Boom Satellites, scheduled for release on June 6, 2012. It serves as the theme song for the fifth episode of the Mobile Suit Gundam Unicorn OVA series. It is the first English-language song used in the series, after previous episodes featured songs by Chiaki Kuriyama, Kylee, CHEMISTRY, and earthmind.

The single was released in two editions: a standard edition with only the title track and a remix of the track, and a special pressing that includes the version of the song as used in Gundam Unicorn. The standard edition will also include special CD-ROM data that consists of the different parts of the song to be used in remixing. In cooperation with Nico Nico Douga, the band will be hosting a remix contest using this content, and the winning remix will be featured on the first ever Boom Boom Satellites remix album Remixed.

Music video
On April 24, 2012, Boom Boom Satellites hosted a Ustream show where they filmed parts of the music video live. They made use of a "Scanning Control Live Projection" system to provide the visuals for the video. They collaborated with EDP Graphic Works for the visual effects, wardrobe stylist Shinichi Miter, writer Kensaku Kakimoto, and it was produced by Rock'n'Roll Japan. The video was released on May 23, 2012.

Track listing

References

External links 
 Boom Boom Satellites official website
 Gundam Unicorn official website

Boom Boom Satellites songs
2012 singles
2012 songs
Gr8! Records singles